The Lipan M3 is a surveillance, reconnaissance and intelligence unmanned aerial vehicle (UAV) developed entirely by staff of the Ejército Argentino (Argentine Army) who have been researching and developing this type of aircraft since 1996 and is the first UAV developed in Latin America.

Design and development
Data and information on the geographical characteristics of the scanned areas and weather conditions can be obtained. It also has signaling devices of high resolution video, telemetry and global positioning data.

With a range of 40 km and autonomy of 5 hours, you can reach a top speed of 170 km / h, carry 20 kg and reach 2,000 m in height (4.6 m wingspan, length 3.55 m and weight of 60 kg ). Take off remote but once in the air you program a route with up to 1,000 waypoints to fly autonomously. It is equipped with cameras Varifocal and infrared vision system, which are multiplexed to leave the video transmitter and receiving station ground control images. These signals are received by a directional antenna oriented manually by the movement of the aircraft.

The Center INTI -Electronics and Informatics and Argentine Army jointly developed software for automatic tracking antenna for unmanned aircraft Lipán. The M3 takes off and lands Lipán manually, and only self to maintain altitude and speed.

On July 10 of 2008 was held at the Army Aviation Airfield in Campo de Mayo, the first night flight of Lipán M3. The test was conducted by staff of the Department of Research, Development and Production and Combat Intelligence Detachment 601.

Other current projects 
It is developing the XM4 which is a more advanced variant and have already provided the first 6 units for experimentation in different geographic regions of Argentina. This model has greater autonomy (double that of Lipán M3) reaches higher and mainly has the ability to operate in fully automatic mode, landing and taking off as programmed.

Also, the Argentina Navy is working on the project Guardian, whose benefits reach a speed of 120 km / h, a maximum height of 1,000 m with an operating range of 50 km . It is part of the first "Tactical Unmanned Air System" and the first units have been designed during the month of December 2007 to Combat Intelligence Detachment 601 of the Argentine Army. Since 2010 the Argentine Army has four Lipán M3.

Operators 

Egyptian Air Force
Egyptian Army

Argentine Army

Specifications (Lipán M3)

See also 

Nostromo Yarará

References 

Unmanned military aircraft of Argentina